The 1989 NBL season was the eighth season of the National Basketball League. Ponsonby's last-place finish in 1988 saw them dropped from the league and replaced by 1988 Conference Basketball League (CBL) champions Palmerston North. Canterbury won the championship in 1989 to claim their second league title. They came from fourth place at the finals weekend to claim the championship, knocking over the top-seeded Palmerston North 92–84 in the semi-finals, before defeating Auckland 91–83 in the final.

Final standings

Season awards
 Most Outstanding Guard: Jamie Dixon (Hawke's Bay)
 Most Outstanding NZ Guard: Byron Vaetoe (Auckland)
 Most Outstanding Forward: Willie Burton (Palmerston North)
 Most Outstanding NZ Forward/Centre: Neil Stephens (Wellington)
 Scoring Champion: Jamie Dixon (Hawke's Bay)
 Rebounding Champion: Willie Burton (Palmerston North)
 Assist Champion: Jamie Dixon (Hawke's Bay)
 Young Player of the Year: John Adie (Auckland)
 Coach of the Year: Curtis Wooten (Hawke's Bay)
 All-Star Five:
 Tyrone Brown (Palmerston North)
 Willie Burton (Palmerston North)
 Jamie Dixon (Hawke's Bay)
 Neil Stephens (Wellington)
 Byron Vaetoe (Auckland)

References

External links
1989 Final Telecast – 1st Half Part 1, 1st Half Part 2, 2nd Half Part 1, 2nd Half Part 2

National Basketball League (New Zealand) seasons
1989 in New Zealand basketball